Empal gentong is a spicy Indonesian curry-like beef soup originating in Cirebon, West Java. It is a variety of the Soto cuisine and is similar to gulai that is usually cooked with firewood in a gentong stove (Javanese for: clay pot). The ingredients include cuts of beef, and cow offal such as intestine, tripes, lungs, etc. cooked with curry-like spices in coconut milk, garlic, chilies, chives (kuchai) and sambal in the form of chilli powder. Empal gentong can be eaten with steamed rice, ketupat or lontong. Empal gentong originated from Battembat, Tengah Tani, Cirebon Regency.

See also

 Soto
List of Indonesian soups

References

Indonesian cuisine
Cirebonese cuisine
Indonesian soups
Beef dishes
Indonesian beef dishes